Eduardo Beca Piccinini (born 30 November 1968) is a former international butterfly swimmer from Brazil.

He currently resides in Arizona, in United States, and his name illustrates the Amazon Swimming Cup. 

He was at the 1991 Pan American Games in Havana, where he earned a bronze medal in the 100-metre butterfly. 

At the 1992 Summer Olympics in Barcelona, Piccinini finished 18th in the 100-metre butterfly, and 15th in the 200-metre butterfly. 

Piccinini was at the 1994 World Aquatics Championships, in Rome, where he finished 25th in the 100-metre butterfly, and 26th in the 200-metre butterfly. 

At the 1995 Pan American Games in Mar del Plata, Piccinini won a silver medal in the 100-metre butterfly and in the 4×100-metre freestyle.  In the 4×100-metre medley relay, Piccinini won the silver medal, beating the South American record, with a time of 3:43.93, along with Gustavo Borges, Rogério Romero and Oscar Godói.

References

External links 
 
 

1968 births
Living people
People from Manaus
Brazilian people of Italian descent
Brazilian male freestyle swimmers
Swimmers at the 1991 Pan American Games
Swimmers at the 1992 Summer Olympics
Swimmers at the 1995 Pan American Games
Olympic swimmers of Brazil
Place of birth missing (living people)
Pan American Games silver medalists for Brazil
Pan American Games bronze medalists for Brazil
Brazilian male butterfly swimmers
Pan American Games medalists in swimming
Brazilian emigrants to the United States
Medalists at the 1991 Pan American Games
Medalists at the 1995 Pan American Games
Sportspeople from Amazonas (Brazilian state)
20th-century Brazilian people